The 1945 Southern Conference men's basketball tournament took place from February 22–24, 1945 at Thompson Gym in Raleigh, North Carolina. The North Carolina Tar Heels won their eighth Southern Conference title, led by head coach Ben Carnevale.

Format
The top eight finishers of the conference's fourteen members were eligible for the tournament. Teams were seeded based on conference winning percentage. The tournament used a preset bracket consisting of three rounds.

Bracket
{{8TeamBracket

| RD1         =QuarterfinalsFebruary 22
| RD2         =SemifinalsFebruary 23
| RD3         =FinalsFebruary 24

| group1      =
| group2      = 

| seed-width  = 
| team-width  = 
| score-width = 

| RD1-seed1   =
| RD1-team1   =South Carolina
| RD1-score1  =55| RD1-seed2   =
| RD1-team2   =Clemson
| RD1-score2  =24

| RD1-seed3   =
| RD1-team3   =North Carolina| RD1-score3  =55| RD1-seed4   =
| RD1-team4   =NC State
| RD1-score4  =28

| RD1-seed5   =
| RD1-team5   =Duke| RD1-score5  =76| RD1-seed6   =
| RD1-team6   =Maryland
| RD1-score6  =49

| RD1-seed7   =
| RD1-team7   =William & Mary| RD1-score7  =54| RD1-seed8   =
| RD1-team8   =The Citadel
| RD1-score8  =41

| RD2-seed1   =
| RD2-team1   =North Carolina| RD2-score1  =39| RD2-seed2   =
| RD2-team2   =South Carolina
| RD2-score2  =26

| RD2-seed3   =
| RD2-team3   =Duke| RD2-score3  =59| RD2-seed4   =
| RD2-team4   =William & Mary
| RD2-score4  =22

| RD3-seed1   =
| RD3-team1   =North Carolina| RD3-score1  =49'''
| RD3-seed2   =
| RD3-team2   =Duke
| RD3-score2  =48
}}
* Overtime game''

See also
List of Southern Conference men's basketball champions

References

Tournament
Southern Conference men's basketball tournament
Southern Conference men's basketball tournament
Southern Conference men's basketball tournament
Basketball competitions in Raleigh, North Carolina
College sports tournaments in North Carolina
College basketball in North Carolina